KABAL is a role-playing game published by Kabal Gaming Systems in 1982.

Description
KABAL is a fantasy role-playing system. The game covers character creation, skills, combat, magic, 70 spells, monsters, and treasure. It includes a player's guide (40 pages), a referee guide (48 pages), and magic spells (36 pages). "KABAL" stands for "Knights And Berserkers And Legerdemain."

Publication history
KABAL was designed by Ernest T. Hams, with a cover by Darlene, and published by Kabal Gaming Systems in 1982 as three digest-sized books (48 pages, 36 pages, and 40 pages), and 12 reference sheets.

Reception
Lawrence Schick called the game a "Lame fantasy system requiring numerous and complex mathematical calculations."

Reviews
Fantasy Gamer (Issue 5 - Apr 1984)

References

Fantasy role-playing games
Role-playing games introduced in 1982